Catoptria oregonicus, the western catoptria or Oregon catoptria moth, is a moth in the family Crambidae. It was described by Augustus Radcliffe Grote in 1880. It is found in North America, where it has been recorded from British Columbia and Alberta to Montana, Oregon and northern coastal California. The habitat consists of meadows in the mountains and foothills.

The wingspan is 17–21 mm. The forewings are white with brown scaling and a central white streak. The hindwings are pale brownish grey. Adults are on wing from July to early September.

References

Crambini
Moths described in 1880
Moths of North America